The following is a list of FCC-licensed radio stations in the U.S. state of Alaska, which can be sorted by their call signs, frequencies, cities of license, licensees, and programming formats.

List of radio stations

Defunct stations
 KABN-FM Kasilof
 KAKQ Fairbanks
 KALA Sitka
 KAMP-LP St. Michael
 KANC Anchorage
 KAQU-LP Sitka
 KAUG Anchorage
 KCDS Deadhorse
 KCKC Long Island
 KGBU Ketchikan
 KGVC Glacier View
 KHGO Homer
 KHOH Seldovia
 KHZK Kotzebue 
 KIAL Unalaska
 KJFP Yakutat
 KMJG Homer
 KOGB McGrath
 KRAW Sterling
 KRSA Petersburg
 KSEW Seward
 KSVJ Seward
 KUWL Fairbanks
 KVBV-LP Anchorage
 KVIM-LP Juneau
 KVOK Kodiak
 KWJG Kasilof
 KWMD Kasilof
 KZXX Kenai

References

Radio stations
Alaska